Robert A. "Bob" Gualtieri (born October 2, 1961) is an American law enforcement officer, lawyer, and politician who is serving as the 15th sheriff of Pinellas County, Florida. He previously served as Chief Deputy and General Counsel to PCSO under Sheriff Jim Coats. Gualtieri was appointed Sheriff by Governor Rick Scott in 2011 to succeed Coats. Gualtieri was elected to the office in his own right in 2012, and was re-elected in 2016. He is a member of the Republican Party.

In March 2018, House Speaker Richard Corcoran appointed Gualtieri to the Marjory Stoneman Douglas High School Public Safety Commission, and Governor Scott named him Chairman. In 2019, the National Sheriffs' Association named Gualtieri the recipient of the Ferris E. Lucas Sheriff of the Year award. Gualtieri was also the elected president of the Florida Sheriffs Association for the 2019-20 year. Gualtieri also serves as the treasurer for the Major County Sheriffs of America.

Early life and law enforcement career
Gualtieri was born on October 2, 1961, in Syracuse, New York. His parents were Linda and Frank Gualtieri. His father served as District Attorney in Onondaga County.

He moved to Florida with his parents in 1980. In 1982, Gualtieri was hired by the Pinellas County Sheriff's Office as a detention deputy for the county jail. In 1983, he joined the Dunedin Police Department as a patrol officer. He rejoined the Sheriff's Office in 1984 as a patrol deputy and later as a detective assigned to drug investigations. He continued to work for PCSO until 1998.

Education and private practice
Gualtieri attended Eckerd College and earned a B.A. in American Studies. After leaving the Sheriff's Office in 1998, he attended Stetson University College of Law, where he earned a J.D. in 2002. From 2003 to 2006, he worked as an attorney for Ford Harrison, a national labor law firm with an office in Tampa.

General Counsel and Chief Deputy for PCSO 
In 2006, Gualtieri accepted an offer from Sheriff Jim Coats to return to the Sheriff's Office as General Counsel. He was appointed Chief Deputy in 2008, a role that saw him in charge of day-to-day operations. He continued to serve in both roles until his appointment as Sheriff in 2011.

As Chief Deputy, Gualtieri cut the department's budget; from 2008 to 2012 it shrank from $278 million to $206 million. He also helped open Pinellas Safe Harbor, an emergency/homeless shelter and diversion program next to the county jail.

Sheriff of Pinellas County
On May 17, 2011, Sheriff Coats announced he would not seek re-election in 2012. Chief Deputy Gualtieri filed to run for sheriff the same day, and formally announced his candidacy two days later. On August 25, Coats announced he would retire on November 7 to support his wife, Cat, who was battling cancer.

Appointment
On October 7, 2011, Florida Governor Rick Scott announced his appointment of Gualtieri as Interim Sheriff of Pinellas County. On November 9, Gualtieri took the oath of office from Sixth Circuit Chief Judge J. Thomas McGrady at the Pinellas County Criminal Justice Center in Clearwater. Gualtieri would serve the remainder of Coats' term, which was set to expire on January 7, 2013.

Elections

2012
Gualtieri faced a notable Republican primary challenge from former Pinellas Sheriff Everett Rice, who served from 1988 to 2004. Other candidates who sought to unseat Gualtieri included Republican Tim Ingold, who later dropped out and supported Rice; Democrats Scott Swope, Randy Heine, and Stephen W. Reilly; and write-in candidate Greg Pound. Gualtieri was endorsed by his predecessor, Jim Coats, who succeeded Rice. In the August 14 Republican primary, Gualtieri defeated Rice  57% to 42%. Gualtieri then faced Democrat Swope and write-in Pound in the general election. Gualtieri won his first full term on November 6, as he defeated Swope 59% to 40%.

2016
Gualtieri qualified for the Republican nomination as he sought his second full term. Republican Josh Black announced a challenge to Gualtieri but neither he nor Democrat Paul Congemi qualified on the ballot. Gualtieri's general election challengers were Independent James McLynas and write-in Greg Pound, the latter having previously ran against Gualtieri in 2012. Gualtieri defeated McLynas 76% to 22% in his November 8 re-election.

2020
On January 2, Gualtieri filed for reelection to a third full term. His Democratic opponents were James McLynas, who previously ran under NPA against Gualtieri in 2016; and Eliseo Santana, an unsuccessful candidate for Pinellas School Board and Clearwater City Council, in 2016 and 2020 respectively.

In May, the Working Families Party publicly denounced Gualtieri, claiming the community is not safe under his leadership, and launched a campaign seeking a resident to step up and challenge him in the November election. The WFP ultimately endorsed Eliseo Santana.

Gualtieri participated in the first sheriff's forum of the 2020 election, hosted by Dream Defenders, on June 17. He spoke alone the first hour, while McLynas and Santana shared the second hour together. When questioned why he would not debate his challengers, Gualtieri acknowledged that he refused to debate McLynas over a series of photo-shopped pictures and memes criticizing him.

As Gualtieri had no Republican opposition, he automatically secured his party's nomination. Santana defeated McLynas in the Democratic primary, and will face Gualtieri in the general election on November 3. Following the primary, Daniel Nichanian of The Appeal called the Gualtieri-Santana matchup "the state's most consequential county-level election". On September 10, Gualtieri and Santana participated in a forum hosted by the League of Women Voters of St. Petersburg.

Policy positions

Body cameras
Although the PCSO uses dashcams in most of their vehicles, Gualtieri opposes the implementation of a body camera program in Pinellas. As of 2019, there are 24 Florida sheriff's offices that regulate body cameras.

Cannabis

Gualtieri actively campaigned in opposition to Florida Amendment 2 in 2014, which would have legalized medical cannabis in the state; the sheriff argued that the amendment was crafted to push for the legalization of recreational use. In 2015, Gualtieri initially expressed support for a medical cannabis bill introduced by Republican state senator Jeff Brandes; however, the sheriff voted against it as a member of the Florida Sheriffs Association.

With the statewide legalization of hemp in 2019, Gualtieri acknowledged complications when it comes to making marijuana prosecutions. In October, Gualtieri and State Attorney Bernie McCabe issued a memo to caution deputies how to deal with individual cases.

Surveillance

Gualtieri has expanded the use of the Face Analysis Comparison & Examination System (FACES), which PCSO began in 2001. As of 2019, FACES is accessed by 273 partner agencies, including 17 federal agencies such as the Federal Bureau of Investigation; U.S. Immigration and Customs Enforcement; and Internal Revenue Service. According to a 2016 study by Georgetown University Law Center, it contains up to 33 million faces, including 22 million Florida driver's license/ID photos and over 11 million law enforcement photos. When asked if the PCSO conducts audits for misuse, Gualtieri replied "No, not really." The network has faced criticism and concerns over lack of transparency, privacy concerns and abuse. In 2019, the agency reportedly requested services for a vendor to provide "real-time facial searching capabilities from live surveillance cameras"; however, a spokesperson claimed this was added to the RFI inadvertently and that the sheriff was opposed to real-time facial recognition.

Disputes with political rivals
Two candidates who have run against Gualtieri, Greg Pound and James McLynas, have alleged police abuse against them in retaliation of their challenges to unseat him. The website Florida Politics has claimed that both men engage in conspiracy theories.

Greg Pound
In a 2004 case preceding Gualtieri's return to the PCSO, local resident Greg Pound lost custody of his children after an incident in which a hybrid wolf dog attacked an infant at his home. Pound subsequently became a perennial candidate for Pinellas Sheriff, with unsuccessful challenges to defeat Sheriff Coats in 2008 and later Sheriff Gualtieri both in 2012 and 2016.

At a 2012 campaign event, Pound was arrested for "trespassing" despite being invited as a candidate for sheriff, an incident in which he believed he was silenced for criticizing Gualtieri.

James McLynas

Beginning in 2009, local resident James McLynas and his estranged wife disputed over the custody of their daughter. She allegedly became violent towards James, but James did not believe it was appropriate to hit his wife in self-defense, so he called 9-1-1. When a male Pinellas deputy arrived to the home, according to James, his wife and the deputy went into their bedroom alone, and a few minutes later McLynas' wife had new scratch on her arm and accused James of domestic violence against her. After James was arrested, his wife admitted to making up the false allegation, yet she was never charged. McLynas claimed his wife later began "dating" the same Pinellas deputy who arrested him, along with two others from the Pinellas Sheriff's Office; two from the Clearwater Police Department and one from the Pasco County Sheriff's Office. McLynas claimed these officers harassed him over the next five years; in 2016, McLynas said there were over 150 false police reports, 7 fraudulent Domestic Violence Injunctions (DVI's), and 22 false Child Protective Investigation reports filed against him and four false arrests from 2009 to 2015.

In August 2013, James McLynas privately informed Gualtieri that he would challenge him for sheriff in the 2016 election to "expose his corruption". On October 28, McLynas' 60 pound, 10-year-old daughter was handcuffed and arrested in an incident he believed was politically motivated. Then on October 30— the day before his custody hearing, McLynas was arrested on five felony charges in what he alleged was Gualtieri's attempt to keep him out of court and lose custody of his daughter, and thus drop his campaign for sheriff. It was later revealed that Gualtieri used a Stingray phone tracker to track McLynas down. At his final custody hearing, the judged ruled that McLynas' wife and the police colluded against James, and he was awarded 100% custody of his daughter while incarcerated— a first in Florida history. All charges against McLynas were dropped and he publicly announced his candidacy for sheriff after being released from jail on November 1.

McLynas persisted through his 2016 campaign; although he finished second to Gualtieri, following the results on the night of the election, he immediately pledged to run again in 2020. In a videotaped incident published in February 2020, McLynas encountered difficulties making a standard public records request; when the clerk refused service to him, she brought in six deputies to question him. McLynas claimed his constitutional rights were violated, that he was harassed and physically assaulted twice, and that the deputies made up numerous false allegations against him in an attempt to arrest him; McLynas believed this was another attempt by Gualtieri to interfere in the election.

Hurricane Irma

During preparations for Hurricane Irma in September 2017, Gualtieri warned Pinellas residents facing mandatory evacuations that while it is a crime not to evacuate, he would not send his deputies to arrest people from their homes. He also stated he did not plan to arrest people with warrants if they showed up at emergency shelters. The sheriff stressed that his office would not respond to emergency calls during the hurricane. On the afternoon of September 9, Gualtieri suspended visitation at the county jail, as they began to evacuate inmates. By the evening of September 10, the rain and winds from the storm forced the sheriff to pull his deputies from the roads. Pinellas temporarily closed their borders when the hurricane passed the county on September 11; residents were allowed to return to Pinellas by 9:30 a.m. and were allowed to return to the barrier islands by 4 p.m. Gualtieri subsequently suspended four deputies for neglecting their duties during the hurricane.

Stoneman Douglas High School Public Safety Commission
Following the [Marjory Stoneman Douglas High School shooting in February 2018, Florida Governor Rick Scott appointed Gualtieri that year to serve as the chair of the MSDHS Public Safety Commission. The commission was asked to analyze information from the shooting and other Florida mass violence incidents, and to provide recommendations. The commission issued a 500-page report in January 2019. Among its recommendations were to provide assailant training for school personnel, bulletproof glass on classroom windows, and to arm teachers. Gualtieri, saying he would not recommend removing Broward County Sheriff Scott Israel from his office, said "Just because your people are imperfect, or in some cases wrong, or in some cases negligent, or in some cases act improperly or engage in malfeasance or misfeasance like [former school resource deputy Scot] Peterson, that doesn’t mean the sheriff did. Peterson I would say had all the tools, had received the training and that was a situation where no matter what you did or what you gave that guy, he was just a coward who wasn’t going to act."

Markeis McGlockton shooting

On July 20, 2018, Sheriff Gualtieri announced that his agency would not charge 47-year-old Michael Drejka for the shooting death of 28-year-old Markeis McGlockton in Clearwater the day before, in accordance with Florida's stand-your-ground law. In August, Gualtieri handed the investigation over to State Attorney Bernie McCabe for a final decision. Drejka was formally charged with a single count of manslaughter later that month. Drejka's trial was held a year later, and he was found guilty and sentenced to 20 years in prison.

Gualtieri's initial decision not to arrest Drejka sparked protests by community activists and received bipartisan criticism from Republicans and Democrats. The Pinellas chapter of the Green Party called for Gualtieri to resign. Civil rights activist Al Sharpton made a stop at a Clearwater church, calling for Gualtieri to "lock him (Drejka) up, or give up your badge." Gualtieri reacted to this statement by suggesting Sharpton to "go back to New York. Mind your own business."

In December 2019, Daniel Nichanian of The Appeal wrote that Gualtieri's record will be on the 2020 ballot, citing the McGlockton case.

COVID-19 pandemic

Arrests and jail conditions
Gualtieri reportedly sent an email to police chiefs on March 16, cautioning them to use "good judgment and decision-making" when determining whether to make an arrest, as the jail struggles with overcrowding during the COVID-19 pandemic. Since March 16 the PCSO has reportedly arrested less than 70 people a day, down from an average of 130-140 bookings before the pandemic. However, James McLynas noted that the PCSO continued to make more arrests over minor non-violent offenses in the following days. Tampa Bay Dream Defenders created an online petition directed to Pinellas and Hillsborough County, to "urge the State Attorney's Offices, the Sixth and Thirteenth Judicial Circuits, the Pinellas and Hillsborough Department of Corrections and police departments across Pinellas and Hillsborough Counties to immediately release all people who are currently incarcerated on bondable offenses from jail and to stop adding new people to the jail population." Gualtieri is opposed to a mass release of inmates as his first option.

In a Tampa Bay Times article published on March 17, Gualtieri asserted that "no inmates were in medical isolation or experiencing worrisome symptoms". It was also  reported that about 220 inmates at the county jail were forced to sleep on the floor, as the Florida Department of Corrections temporarily suspended inmate transfers. By March 21, about 200 inmates were released "through the normal process" and the number of inmates who slept on the floor had been reduced to about 60. By March 23, about 500 inmates had been released and 40 slept on the floor.

Impact on businesses and economy
On March 17, county officials announced that restaurants and other establishments in Pinellas must stop selling alcohol by 10 p.m. starting the following day. "This is about people gathering in massive groups," Gualtieri said. "This is a serious problem that requires a serious response."

At a joint news conference with Clearwater Police Chief Daniel Slaughter at Clearwater Beach's Pier 60 on March 21, Gualtieri thanked Pinellas citizens who were complying with orders to stay off county beaches. He criticized the national media for replaying a viral news clip of spring breakers packed on the beach earlier in the week, saying the problem did not reoccur in the following days, and criticized county leaders for caving into pressure to shut down the beaches, claiming such a closure would be a challenge for patrolling.

On March 26, Gualtieri lead 200 deputies and officers by posting 14,000 "safer at home" orders on businesses, one day after county officials issued the "safer at home" directive.  Tampa Bay Guardian, an independent online newspaper, called the event a "photo opportunity" and reported that Gualtieri violated the county order by improperly posting notices to make them visible outside the premise but not to those "present on the premises", as the order requires.

Positive Covid diagnosis
On August 14, the sheriff's office announced that Gualtieri tested positive for COVID-19. He tested negative a week after his positive diagnosis.

Politics
Gualtieri has been recognized by SaintPetersBlog/Florida Politics on their annual list of "Tampa Bay's 25 Most Powerful Politicians".

In the 2016 United States presidential election in Florida, Gualtieri voted for Donald Trump.

Electoral history

See also
Republican Party of Florida

References

Notes

Citations

Sources

External links
 Sheriff Bob Gualtieri at Pinellas County Sheriff's Office
 Pinellas County Sheriff Bio at Florida Sheriffs Association

1961 births
21st-century American lawyers
21st-century American politicians
American deputy sheriffs
American police detectives
Eckerd College alumni
Florida lawyers
Florida Republicans
Florida sheriffs
Living people
People from Pinellas County, Florida
People from Syracuse, New York
Stetson University College of Law alumni
Stoneman Douglas High School shooting